Hmong College Prep Academy (HCPA) is a charter school in St. Paul, Minnesota that has grades K-12.

HCPA is open to all students.  It has a large population of Hmong American and Karen American students.

History
HCPA started in 2004 in Minneapolis as a grade 8-10 school.  In 2006, HCPA moved to the Midway neighborhood of St. Paul.  The first graduating class was in 2007.  Also, in 2007, Phase II of the school's expansion plan began with additional buildings being constructed.  A new high school was built in 2013, signifying the start of HCPA's Phase III expansion.  The most recent addition, a new elementary school, ended Phase IV expansion in 2017.  A larger and more complete middle school opened for the start of the 2021-2022 school year.

School Programs
All HCPA students receive small group advising through HCPA's College Prep Program.  Starting in 2010, the College Prep Program is a grade 6-12 plan in which students remain with a single teacher and student cohort for their entire stay in a particular school (MS, HS).  These advisory cohorts are represented by a college/mascot when competing with other CPs at HCPA's monthly and quarterly assemblies.

Traditions
Students at HCPA have a quarterly Warrior Day where students compete in academic, athletic and spirit competitions.
Additionally, HCPA has an annual World Culture Day . The day is filled with food, song, dance and traditional clothing. .

HCPA students Also have a school wide picnic. Recently, the school picnic has also provided a platform for community outreach. Groups including the Saint Paul Police, Ramsey County Sheriff's Department, Minnesota National Guard and Saint Paul Fire Department have regaled the students with demonstrations that range from K-9 exhibitions to helicopter fly-ins.

Athletics and Clubs
Hmong College Prep Academy competes in the Eastern Minnesota Athletic Conference and has the following sports teams.

High school level:
Boys Soccer
Football
Wrestling
Track
Girls Soccer
Girls Volleyball (Varsity, Junior Varsity, C Squad) - 2019 Eastern Minnesota Athletic Conference Team Sportsmanship Award 
Boys Basketball (Varsity, Junior Varsity)
Girls Basketball - 2019-2020 Eastern Minnesota Athletic Conference Team Sportsmanship Award
Girls Badminton

Middle school sports teams:
Coed soccer
Coed basketball
Coed volleyball

Clubs:
Robotics Club
Flag Football
eSports
Cheerleading
Boys Volleyball
Hmong Dance
Knowledge Bowl
GSA
Bass Fishing
Student Ambassadors

See also
 History of the Hmong in Minneapolis–Saint Paul
 Language/culture-based charter school

External links
 Hmong College Prep Academy

Charter schools in Minnesota
Education in Saint Paul, Minnesota
High schools in Saint Paul, Minnesota
Hmong-American culture in Minneapolis–Saint Paul
Hmong-American culture and history